The 2012 Bernick's Miller Lite Open is being held from October 26 to 28 at the Bemidji Curling Club in Bemidji, Minnesota, as part of the 2012–13 World Curling Tour. Though the event is listed as an event on the men's tour, it features one women's team, as it is open to both men and women. The event is being held in a round robin format, and the purse for the event is $18,000. In the final, Al Hackner of Northern Ontario defeated hometown favorite Pete Fenson with a score of 6–4.

Teams
The teams are listed as follows:

Round robin standings
Final Round Robin Standings

Tiebreaker

Playoffs
The playoffs draw is listed as follows:

References

External links

2012 in curling
Curling in Minnesota